General elections are scheduled to be held in Sierra Leone in June 2023. The Parliament and President will be elected.

Electoral system
Members of Parliament will be elected by proportional representation, after a presidential decree by Julius Maada Bio in October 2022 abolished the first-past-the-post system that had been used since 2008.

See also
List of elections in 2023

References 

Sierra Leone
2020s in Sierra Leone
Presidential elections in Sierra Leone
Elections in Sierra Leone
Sierra Leone